Jhimpir Railway Station is located at Jhimpir village, Thatta district of Sindh province, Pakistan,  from Karachi. Jhimpir Wind Power Plant is Pakistan's first wind power plant.

See also
 Keenjhar Lake
 List of railway stations in Pakistan
 Pakistan Railways

References

Railway stations in Thatta District
Railway stations on Karachi–Peshawar Line (ML 1)